Heinrich von Morungen or Henry of Morungen (died c. 1220 or 1222) was a German Minnesinger.

Life
Morungen's lyrics can reliably be dated on both literary and biographical grounds to around the period 1190–1200.

He is probably identical with the Hendricus de Morungen who is mentioned in two charters of Dietrich I, Margrave of Meissen. This Hendricus presumably originated from the castle of Morungen near Sangerhausen in Thuringia, a location consistent with the language of the songs. As a "retired knight" (miles emeritus) he received from his patron Dietrich, also a patron of Walter von der Vogelweide, a pension for his "high personal merits" (alta suae vitae merita). In 1213 he transferred this to the monastery of St Thomas in Leipzig, which he entered himself in 1217. According to a 16th century source based on the records of the monastery, he died there in 1222. The same source reports a certainly apocryphal story of a visit to India.

In the Late Middle Ages, there was extant a ballad of Der edele Möringer ("The Noble Moringer"), which transferred to Heinrich von Morungen the stock theme of the return of a husband believed lost.

Works

There survive 35 Minnelieder by Heinrich, with 115 verses, of which only 104 are to be found in the great collection of the Codex Manesse. No melodies have survived.
 
Heinrich is a very graphic lyricist: he particularly often makes use of images of shining (sun, moon, evening star, gold, jewels, mirror) as comparisons by which to describe the lady who is being sung and praised.

An essential theme in Heinrich's work is the demonic nature of Minne, the Middle High German word for this type of love, which for the mediaeval writers was embodied by the ancient classical goddess of love, Venus. Minne is experienced partly as a magical, pathological, even fatal power, but also as a religious and mystical experience.

In form and content the poems are influenced by the Provençal troubadour lyric: dactylic rhythms and through-rhymes (Durchreimung) occur frequently. Motifs in the content have also been taken over from the same source: for example, the motif, otherwise rare in German Minnesang, of the "notice of termination of the service of love" (Lied XXVII), the roots of which are to be found in classical literature (for example Ovid).

Editions

  With commentary and Modern German translation.

Translations
 Text of eight songs with parallel English translation.

Notes

References

External links
  — Texts of all the songs, taken from the 38th edition of Des Minnesangs Frühling.

 
 
 
 "Nein, ja!" (Salzburger Ensemble for Ancient Music, Dulamans Vröudenton)

Facsimiles
Digital facsimiles of Heinrich von Morungen's lyrics in the 
 Kleine Heidelberger Liederhandschrift (A) (University Library, Heidelberg)
 Weingarten Manuscript (B) (Württembergischen Landesbibliothek, Stuttgart)
 Manesse Codex (C) (University Library, Heidelberg)

1220s deaths
Minnesingers
Musicians from Thuringia
Year of birth unknown
13th-century German poets